Bi Irié Fernand Gouré (born 12 April 2002) is an Ivorian professional footballer who plays as a forward for Hungarian club Újpest on loan from Belgian First Division A club Westerlo.

Club career
On 25 August 2022, Gouré joined Újpest in Hungary on loan.

Honours 
Westerlo

 Belgian First Division B: 2021–22

References

2002 births
Living people
Ivorian footballers
Association football forwards
Maccabi Netanya F.C. players
K.V.C. Westerlo players
Újpest FC players
Israeli Premier League players
Challenger Pro League players
Belgian Pro League players
Ivorian expatriate footballers
Ivorian expatriate sportspeople in Israel
Expatriate footballers in Israel
Ivorian expatriate sportspeople in Belgium
Expatriate footballers in Belgium
Ivorian expatriate sportspeople in Hungary
Expatriate footballers in Hungary